Hunkeler und die Augen des Ödipus is a 2012 Swiss German language television film that was filmed and produced at locations in Basel respectively in Switzerland. It is the last film of the six-episode serial starring Mathias Gnädinger as Kommissär Hunkeler.

Cast 
In alphabetical order
 Mathias Gnädinger as Kommissär Peter Hunkeler
 Charlotte Heinimann as Hedwig
 Marie Leuenberger as Beate Keller
 Barbara Melzl as Judith Keller
 Axel Milberg as Bernhard Vetter
 Johann Adam Oest as Walter Rutziska
 Gilles Tschudi as Madörin

Plot (excerpt) 
Peter Hunkeler (Mathias Gnädinger) has been retired as Kommissär (inspector) of the Basel Police, and for the first time since years, enjoys with his fiancée Hedwig a play in the Basel theatre. His old passion goes back to his early years when he had played on stage, and planned making the acting to his profession, but then opted for the supposedly safer career with the police. The premiere of Sophocles' Oedipus Rex – Hunkeler fascinated, Hedwig sleeping – turns upside down, as one of the actors, Walter Rutziska, is sabotaging the production by suddenly showing up drunk in the audience and insulting the audience. Hunkeler assumes the derailment a brilliant director's incidence, and at the premiere party, he would like to congratulate the director and star of the production, Bernhard Vetter – and conceded puzzled a slap in the face. Vetter is furiously chasing the whole society to go to hell and disappears. The "Provence", the name of the yacht the party was onboard it, disappears in the night, and the next morning is found leaderless and damaged on a dam downriver. Bernhard Vetter is missing, and a short time later fished out of the Rhine river, having empty eye sockets...

Title 
The title of the film derives from the German term meaning Hunkeler and the eyes of Oedipus referring to the play Oedipus Rex.

Production 
The television film is the last episode of six films about Kommissär Hunkeler starring Mathias Gnädinger, which were produced for the Swiss television SF DRS between 2004 (Das Paar im Kahn) and 2012. The Swiss German language movie bases on the 2010 novel Hunkeler und die Augen des Ödipus by Hansjörg Schneider, and was filmed at locations in Basel, at the Rhein river respectively in Switzerland and Germany, as well as in the neighboring Alsace (France). Mathias Gnädinger, in his early years a stage actor at the Theater Neumarkt at Neumarkt, Zürich, died on 3 April 2015, hence the Hunkeler serial comprises six films in total.

Festivals 
 2013 Solothurn Film Festival

References

External links 
 

2012 television films
2012 films
Swiss television films
Swiss German-language films
2012 crime films
Films shot in Switzerland
German-language television shows
Swiss crime films